HUF may refer to:

Places
 Terre Haute International Airport (IATA: HUF), in Indiana, United States

People 
 František Huf (born 1981), Czech bodybuilder
 Hans-Christian Huf (born 1956), German historian

Brands and enterprises
 Huf Haus GmbH & Co. KG, a German company operating worldwide and based in Hartenfels, Westerwald region, that manufactures prefabricated homes
 HUF Worldwide, a skateboarding team and streetwear brand founded by Keith Hufnagel and Anne Freeman

Other uses 
 Hindu undivided family, a legal term related to the Hindu Marriage Act
 Humene language (ISO 639-3 language code), spoken in Papua New Guinea
 Hungarian forint by ISO 4217 currency code

See also
Huff (disambiguation)
Huffington, a surname
Huffy, an American supplier of bicycles